Klaas Pieter "Sjaak" Pieters (born 22 July 1957) is a retired Dutch track cyclist who was active between 1976 and 1985. He competed at the 1976 Summer Olympics in the sprint, but failed to reach the final. He won two bronze medals in the tandem at world championships, in 1978 and 1982. He was a national champion in this event in 1977, 1978 and 1982–1985.

Pieters is married to Olympic gymnast Ans Dekker. His brother Peter and niece Amy are also Olympic cyclists.

See also
 List of Dutch Olympic cyclists

References

1957 births
Living people
Dutch male cyclists
Olympic cyclists of the Netherlands
Cyclists at the 1976 Summer Olympics
People from Haarlemmermeer
Cyclists from North Holland